Lindfield Cricket Club Ground is a cricket ground in Lindfield, Sussex.  The first recorded match on the ground was in 1948, when the Sussex Second XI played the Essex Second XI in the Minor Counties Championship.  In 1993, the ground held a Women's One Day International between Netherlands women and New Zealand women in the 1993 Women's Cricket World Cup.

In local domestic cricket, the ground is the home venue of Lindfield Cricket Club.

References

External links
Lindfield Cricket Club Ground on CricketArchive
Lindfield Cricket Ground on Cricinfo

Cricket grounds in West Sussex
Sports venues completed in 1948